The 2007 Nigerian Senate election in Nasarawa State was held on April 21, 2007, to elect members of the Nigerian Senate to represent Nasarawa State. Suleiman Adokwe representing Nasarawa South and Abubakar Sodangi representing Nasarawa West won on the platform of Peoples Democratic Party, while Patricia Akwashiki representing Nasarawa North won on the platform of the All Nigeria Peoples Party.

Overview

Summary

Results

Nasarawa South 
The election was won by Suleiman Adokwe of the Peoples Democratic Party.

Nasarawa West 
The election was won by Abubakar Sodangi of the Peoples Democratic Party.

Nasarawa North 
The election was won by Patricia Akwashiki of the All Nigeria Peoples Party candidate Patricia Akwashiki.

References 

April 2007 events in Nigeria
Nasarawa State Senate elections
Nas